Anne-Sophie Vanden Borre (born 17 June 2001) is a field hockey player from Belgium, who plays as a midfielder.

Personal life
Anne-Sophie Vanden Borre is the younger sister of Stéphanie Vanden Borre, a member of the Belgium national team.

Career

Club hockey
In the Belgian Hockey League, Englebert plays club hockey for the Gantoise.

National teams

Under–18
In 2018, Vanden Borre was a member of the Belgium U–18 team at the EuroHockey Youth Championship in Santander. At the tournament, Belgium finished in second place, taking home silver.

Under–21
Following her debut for the Under–18 side in 2018, Vanden Borre appeared in the national Under–21 side in 2019. She represented the team at the EuroHockey Junior Championship in Valencia. The team finished fourth, qualifying for the 2021 FIH Junior World Cup.

Red Panthers
In December 2019, Anne-Sophie Vanden Borre was named in the Red Panthers squad for the first time. She was named in the provisional Belgian squad for the second season of the FIH Pro League.

References

External links
 
 

2001 births
Living people
Female field hockey midfielders
Belgian female field hockey players